"Love Blonde" is a song by English singer Kim Wilde, released as the first single from her third album, Catch as Catch Can (1983). The song sold moderately, restoring some of the ground lost from her previous release "Child Come Away" and is reputedly about Wilde herself. It features Gary Barnacle on saxophone. It marked the first occasion where Wilde released a 12" extended version of one of her singles, and the first time she released a 12" single in her home country (she had previously released 12" singles in Europe, but merely featuring the normal version of the single). The UK edition of the 12" single included a free poster. The version on the 7" single was slightly shorter than that on the original LP.

Charts

Weekly charts

Year-end charts

References

Kim Wilde songs
1983 singles
Songs written by Marty Wilde
Songs written by Ricky Wilde
1983 songs
RAK Records singles